Adarsh Nagar is one of the 200 Legislative Assembly constituencies of Rajasthan state in India. It is in Jaipur district and is a segment of Jaipur (Lok Sabha constituency). This seat came into existence after the 2008 delimitation exercise.

Member of Legislative Assembly

Election results

2018

See also
List of constituencies of the Rajasthan Legislative Assembly
Jaipur district

References

Jaipur district
Assembly constituencies of Rajasthan